Owch Tappeh-ye Sharqi Rural District is in the Central District of Mianeh County, East Azerbaijan province, Iran. At the National Census of 2006, its population was 2,636 in 535 households. There were 2,026 inhabitants in 526 households at the following census of 2011. At the most recent census of 2016, the population of the rural district was 1,843 in 557 households. The largest of its 27 villages was Gavanlu, with 337 people.

References 

Meyaneh County

Rural Districts of East Azerbaijan Province

Populated places in East Azerbaijan Province

Populated places in Meyaneh County